Agelo usually refers to two neighbouring towns in the Dutch province of Overijssel:
 Groot Agelo
 Klein Agelo

Populated places in Overijssel
Dinkelland

nl:Groot Agelo